Giovanni Antonio Viperani (1535 - March 1610) was an Italian renaissance humanist and Roman Catholic prelate who served as Bishop of Giovinazzo (1589–1610).

Biography
Giovanni Antonio Viperani was born in Messina, Sicily. On 17 May 1589, he was appointed by Pope Sixtus V as Bishop of Giovinazzo in the region of Apulia. He served as Bishop of Giovinazzo until his death in March 1610. While bishop, he was the principal consecrator of Camillo Borghese, Bishop of Castro di Puglia, and Decio Caracciolo Rosso, Archbishop of Bari.

Works 
A learned humanist, Viperani achieved some early fame with a systematic treatise on the writing of history (De scribenda historia, 1569) and wrote numerous other works, always in Latin, over the subsequent three decades, on biography, providence, and virtue, among many others, as well as a volume of his own poems. In 1579 Viperani published his De poetica libri tres, dedicated to Philip II's Secretary of State, Antoine Perrenot de Granvelle. Shortly after the De poetica came a rhetoric and a commentary on Cicero's De Optimo Genere Oratorum (1581). Viperani's De scribenda historia was included in the Artis Historicae Penus of 1579. His writings were collected and published in 1605 in Naples.

References

External links and additional sources

 (for Chronology of Bishops) 
 (for Chronology of Bishops) 

16th-century Italian Roman Catholic bishops
17th-century Italian Roman Catholic bishops
1535 births
1610 deaths
Bishops appointed by Pope Sixtus V